Niusha Zeighami (born July 9, 1980) is an Iranian actress. She has received various accolades, including nominations for two Crystal Simorgh and a Hafez Award.

Career
Niusha Zeighami has an academic degree in Child Psychology.

She graduated from the Young Cinema Society in 2005 and was cast for a role in the series ‘In the Eye of the Storm’ (2003-2009).

She also acted in the series ‘Tell the Truth’ (2012).

Zeyghami has appeared in several movies, including ‘The Juggler’ (2004), ‘The Confrontation’ (2004), ‘My Sin’ (2006), ‘Hidden Feeling’ (2006), ‘Parkway’ (2006), ‘The Outcasts’ (2006), ‘Forced Blessing’ (2007), ‘The Outcasts 2’ (2008), ‘Extreme Cold’ (2009), ‘Mirror and Candlestick’ (2012) and ‘Iran Burger’ (2014).

Filmography
2014 Iran Burger
2012 Room Number Zero as Sara
2012 Gasht-e Ershad?! as Parisa
2011 Porteghal khooni 
2011 The Swallows in Love
2010 Dokhtare Shahe Parion 
2009 Ekhrajiha 2 as Narges
2009 Democracy Tou Rouze Roshan as Fatemeh
2008 Movajehe 
2008 Tofigh-e Ejbari as Simin
2007 Ekhrajiha as Narges
2007 Hess-e Penhan 
2007 Parkway as Raha's Friend
2006 Gonah-e man 
2006 Shoorideh

References

External links 
 

Living people
1980 births
People from Tehran
Actresses from Tehran
Iranian female models
Iranian film actresses
Iranian television actresses
Shahid Beheshti University alumni